John Atkinson (5 December 1884 – 26 November 1914) was a Scottish amateur footballer who played in the Scottish League for Hamilton Academical, Queen's Park, Celtic and Partick Thistle as an outside left.

Personal life 
Atkinson was a medical student and later qualified as a doctor, moving to County Durham to practice. After the outbreak of the First World War in August 1914, he moved to work in Madagascar. He died in the Atlantic Ocean, off the west coast of Africa, in an accident on 26 November 1914.

Career statistics

Honours 
Hamilton Academical
 Lanarkshire Cup: 1904–05, 1905–06

References

1884 births
1914 deaths
Sportspeople from Cambuslang
Scottish footballers
Association football outside forwards
Queen's Park F.C. players
Scottish Football League players
Hamilton Academical F.C. players
Celtic F.C. players
Partick Thistle F.C. players
Deaths by drowning
Footballers from South Lanarkshire